John Legend is an American soul singer, songwriter and pianist. In 2005, Legend received fifteen nominations and won two, including Best New Artist at the Black Entertainment Television Awards (BET Awards) and Best R&B Act at the MOBO Awards. In 2006, Legend received ten nominations and won five, including Best R&B Male Vocal Performance for "Stay with You", Best R&B Album for Get Lifted, Best New Artist at the Grammy Awards; Best R&B/Soul Album Male for Get Lifted, Best R&B/Soul Single Male for "Ordinary People" at the Soul Train Music Awards. In 2007, Legend received six nominations and won three, including Best R&B Performance by a Duo or Group for "Family Affair", Best Male R&B Vocal Performance for "Heaven" at the Grammy Awards; Best R&B/Soul Single Male for "Save Room" at the Soul Train Music Awards. In 2017, Legend was the recipient of Smithsonian Magazine's American Ingenuity Award for Performing Arts. In 2018 Legend became the first Black man to officially achieve an EGOT with his Emmy win for "Jesus Christ Superstar". Overall, Legend has won 33 awards from 88 nominations.

Major Awards

Academy Awards
{| class="wikitable"
|-
! Year
! Category
! Project 
! Result
|-
|2014
|Best Original Song
|"Glory" (with Common)
|

Daytime Emmy Awards
The Daytime Emmy Award is an American award bestowed by the National Academy of Television Arts and Sciences in recognition of excellence in American Daytime television programming. Legend has received one award from two nominations for Crow: The Legend.
{| class="wikitable"
|-
! Year
! Category
! Project 
! Result
|-
|rowspan="2"|2019|Outstanding Interactive Media for a Daytime Program (as producer)
|rowspan="2"|Crow: The Legend|
|-
|Outstanding Special Class Special (as producer)
|

Primetime Emmy Awards
The Primetime Emmy Award is an American award bestowed by the Academy of Television Arts & Sciences in recognition of excellence in American primetime television programming. Legend has received one award from two nominations for Jesus Christ Superstar Live in Concert.

Billboard Music Awards
The Billboard Music Awards are sponsored by Billboard magazine and is based on sales data by Nielsen SoundScan and radio information by Nielsen Broadcast Data Systems. Legend received two of seven nominations.

|-
|rowspan="7"|2015
|rowspan="2"|John Legend
|Top Radio Songs Artist
|
|-
|Top R&B Artist
|
|-
|rowspan="4"|"All of Me"
|Top Hot 100 Song
|
|-
|Top Radio Song
|
|-
|Top Streaming Song (Audio)
|
|-
|Top R&B Song
|
|-
|Love in the Future|Top R&B Album
|
|-
|}

Black Reel Awards
The Black Reel Awards is an annual American awards ceremony hosted by the Foundation for the Augmentation of African-Americans in Film (FAAAF) to recognize excellence of African-Americans, as well as the cinematic achievements of the African diaspora, in the global film industry, as assessed by the Foundation’s voting membership.

|-
|2011
|"Shine"
|rowspan="6"|Outstanding Original Song
|
|-
|rowspan="2"|2013
|"Who Did That To You?"
|
|-
|"Tonight (Best You Ever Had)"
|
|-
|2015
|"Glory"
|
|-
|2017
|"Start"
|
|-
|2021
|"Make It Work" 
|
|}

CMT Music Awards
The CMT Music Awards is a fan-voted awards show for country music videos and television performances since 1967. Legend has been nominated twice.

|-
|rowspan=2|2021
|rowspan=2|"Hallelujah"  (with Carrie Underwood)
|Video of the Year
|
|-
|Collaborative Video of the Year
|
|-

iHeartRadio Music Awards
iHeartRadio Music Awards is an international music awards show founded by iHeartRadio in 2014. Legend has been nominated twice.

|-
|rowspan="2"|2015
|rowspan="2"|"All of Me"
|Song of the Year
|
|-
|Best Lyrics
|

Mnet Asian Music Awards
Mnet Asian Music Awards, otherwise abbreviated as MAMA, is an award show held by Mnet annually that credits South Korean artists, as well as foreign artists who have had an impact in the South Korean Music industry.

|-
|rowspan="3"|2014
|John Legend
|International Favorite Artist
|
|}

MOBO Awards
The MOBO Awards (an acronym for "Music of Black Origin") were established in 1996 by Kanya King. They are held annually in the United Kingdom to recognize artists of any race or nationality performing music of black origin. Legend has won one award from three nominations.

|-
|rowspan="3"|2005
|Get Lifted|Best Album
|
|-
|John Legend
|Best R&B Act
|
|-
|"Ordinary People"
|Best Video
|

MTV Video Music Awards
The MTV Video Music Awards were established in 1984 by MTV to celebrate the top music videos of the year. Legend has been nominated eight times and won twice .

|-
|rowspan="3"|2005
|rowspan="3"|"Ordinary People"
|Best R&B Video
|
|-
|Best New Artist
|
|-
|Best Male Video
|
|-
|2014
|"All of Me"
|Best Male Video
|
|-
|2015
|"One Man Can Change the World" (with Kanye West and Big Sean)
|Best Video with a Social Message
|
|-
|rowspan="1"|2017
|rowspan="1"|"Surefire"
|Best Fight Against the System
|
|-
|rowspan="2"|2019
|rowspan="1"|"Higher World" (with DJ Khaled and Nipsey Hussle )
|Best Hip-Hop Video
|
|-
|rowspan="1"|"Preach"
|Best Video for Good
|

NAACP Image Awards
The NAACP Image Awards is an award presented annually by the American National Association for the Advancement of Colored People to honor outstanding people of color in film, television, music and literature. Legend has been nominated twice.

|-
|rowspan="2"|2009
|John Legend
|Outstanding Male Artist
|
|-
|Greenlight|Outstanding Song
|
|-
|rowspan="4"|2014
|John Legend
|Outstanding Male Artist
|
|-
|"All of Me"
|Outstanding Song
|
|-
|"Made to Love"
|Outstanding Music Video
|
|-
|Love in the Future|Outstanding Album
|
|-
|rowspan="2"|2016
|John Legend
|President Award
|
|-
| "One Man Can Change The World" (with Big Sean & Kanye West) 
|Outstanding Duo, Group or Collaboration
|
|-
|rowspan="1"|2018
| "Surefire (Piano Version)"
|Outstanding Song, Traditional
|
|-
|rowspan="4"|2019
|rowspan=2|John Legend
|Outstanding Actor in a Television Movie, Limited-Series or Dramatic Special (for Jesus Christ Superstar Live in Concert) 
|
|-
|Outstanding Male Artist
|
|-
|rowspan=2|"A Good Night" (feat. BloodPop)
|Outstanding Duo, Group or Collaboration
|
|-
|Outstanding Song, Contemporary
|
|-
|rowspan=2|2021
|Bigger Love|Outstanding Album
|
|-
|John Legend
|Outstanding Male Artist
|

Soul Train Music Awards
The Soul Train Music Awards is an annual award show aired in national broadcast syndication that honors the best in African American music and entertainment established in 1987. Legend has won five awards from twelve nominations.

|-
|2005
|"Used to Love U"
|Best R&B/Soul or Rap New Artist
|
|-
|rowspan="2"|2006
|Get Lifted|Best R&B/Soul Album, Male
|
|-
|"Ordinary People"
|Best R&B/Soul Single, Male
|
|-
|rowspan="2"|2007
|Once Again|Best R&B/Soul Album Male
|
|-
|"Save Room"
|Best R&B/Soul Single Male
|
|-
|rowspan="4"|2014
|rowspan="2"|"All of Me"
|Song of the Year
|
|-
|Record of the Year (The Ashford & Simpson Songwriter's Award)
|
|-
|Love in the Future|Album of the Year
|
|-
|John Legend
|Best R&B/Soul Male Artist
|
|-
|rowspan="3"|2015
|rowspan="3"|"Glory" (with Common)
|Song of the Year
|
|-
|Ashford & Simpson Songwriter's Award
|
|-
|Best Collaboration
|
|-
|rowspan="2"|2018
|rowspan="1"|"A Good Night" (with BloodPop)
|Best Collaboration Performance
|
|-
|John Legend
|Best R&B/Soul Male Artist
|
|-

Vibe Awards
The Vibe Awards are hosted annually by Vibe magazine.  Legend has been nominated four times.

|-
|rowspan="4"|2005
|rowspan="2"|John Legend
|R&B Voice of the Year
|
|-
|Artist of the Year
|
|-
|Get Lifted''
|Album of the Year
|
|-
|"Ordinary People"
|Best R&B Song
|

Critics Awards

African-American Film Critics Association
The African-American Film Critics Association (AAFCA) is a group of African-American film critics that give various awards for excellence in film at the end of each year. Legend has won one time.

|-
|2014
|"Glory" (with Common)
|Best Music
|

Critics' Choice Movie Awards
The Critics' Choice Movie Awards are bestowed annually by the Broadcast Film Critics Association (BFCA) to honor the finest in cinematic achievement. Legend has won one award in 2015.

|-
|2011
|"Shine" 
|rowspan=2|Best Song
|
|-
|2015
|"Glory" (with Common)
|
|-
|2018
|Himself (for Jesus Christ Superstar Live in Concert)
|Best Actor in a Movie Made for Television or Limited Series
|

Georgia Film Critics Association
Legend won one award from the Georgia Film Critics Association in 2015.

|-
|2015
|"Glory" (with Common)
|Best Original Song
|

Houston Film Critics Society Awards
The Houston Film Critics Society is a non-profit film critic organization which presents an annual set of film awards for "extraordinary accomplishment in film" in a ceremony held at the Museum of Fine Arts, Houston. Legend has been nominated once.

|-
|2015
|"Glory" (with Common)
|Best Original Song
|

References

Legend, John
Awards